Glazunov Glacier is a glacier flowing north into Stravinsky Inlet from Monteverdi Peninsula, Alexander Island. The glacier was named by the USSR Academy of Sciences in 1987 after Alexander Glazunov (1865-1936), a Russian composer.

References

Glaciers of Alexander Island